Billy Wayne Davis, sometimes known as Bill Davis, is a land developer and former state senator for the Arizona Senate in the United States.

Early life
Billy Davis was born in Athens, Alabama, on May 7, 1945. 

He is of Welsh, English, Irish, and Cherokee descent on his father's side and his mother's ancestors were from Switzerland. 

Billy grew up and went to school in Chattanooga, Tennessee. 

His father died when he was eleven years old.

Billy Davis married Billie J. Johnson on May 4, 1963, in Chattanooga, Tennessee. They have three grown children and live in Kennesaw, Georgia.

Military career

Davis served four years in the Navy and two years in the Navy Reserves from 1963 to 1969, two of which were in Vietnam. Davis earned the National Defense Service Medal, The Vietnam Campaign Medal with Device (1960–), The Vietnam Service Medal (with two Bronze Stars) and the Navy Unit Commendation Ribbon and Letters of Commendations.

Political career
Davis served two terms in the Arizona State Senate from January 3, 1983, through January 6, 1987, for the 19th district in Phoenix, Arizona.

In 1986, he was censured by the Senate Ethics Committee for failing to disclose his finances and poor judgment in his business practices.

He ran as a Congressional candidate in Georgia in 2016, during which time an investigation by FOX 5 found that he had been convicted of having lied on a 1997 loan application, for which he was incarcerated; had bankruptcies; and had a $782,560 judgment from a civil suit.

Gallery

References

External links

Developer's website

1945 births
Living people
People from Athens, Alabama
People from Kennesaw, Georgia
Politicians from Chattanooga, Tennessee
Arizona state senators
United States Navy personnel of the Vietnam War
United States Navy sailors